(786–833 CE) was a mathematician and translator.

Biography
Almost nothing is known about his life, except that he was active in Baghdad, then the capital of the ʿAbbāsid Empire.

He was the first author who translated Euclid's Elements from Greek into Arabic. His first translation was made for Yaḥyā ibn Khālid, the Vizier of Caliph Hārūn al‐Rashīd. He made a second, improved, more concise translation for the Caliph al-Maʾmūn (813–833).

At the beginning of the 12th century CE, Adelard of Bath translated 's version of Euclid's Elements into Latin.

References

External links
 (PDF version)

Greek–Arabic translators
Mathematicians from the Abbasid Caliphate
786 births
833 deaths
9th-century mathematicians
9th-century astronomers